Obert A. Olson (April 23, 1882 – August 22, 1938) was a North Dakota public servant and politician with the Republican Party. 

He served as the North Dakota State Treasurer from 1919 to 1920, and did not seek re-election to a second term. Prior to serving as State Treasurer, he was in the North Dakota House of Representatives from 1917 to 1918 as a representative from Bowman, North Dakota. He later served in the North Dakota Senate from 1925 to 1928. He died in Bismarck in August of 1938 at age 56 while serving as the mayor of Bismarck, North Dakota. He was buried at Saint Mary's Cemetery in Burleigh County, North Dakota.

References

1882 births
1938 deaths
State treasurers of North Dakota
Members of the North Dakota House of Representatives
North Dakota state senators
20th-century American politicians